Prescott Niles (born May 2, 1954) is an American rock bassist. He is best known as bassist with the Knack, who had a No. 1 US / No. 6 UK hit with "My Sharona".

Since 2013 he has played bass with Mike Pinera's Classic Rock All-Stars and Missing Persons.

Prescott Niles mostly played a Rickenbacker 4001 and a Guild bass during his tenure with The Knack.

References

External links
Prescott Niles NAMM Oral History Interview (2007)

1954 births
Living people
American rock bass guitarists
American male bass guitarists
American new wave musicians
The Knack members
20th-century American guitarists